Zastražišće  is a village on the island of Hvar in Croatia. It is connected by the D116 highway.

References

Hvar
Populated places in Split-Dalmatia County